Aller may refer to:

Places

Rivers
Aller (Germany), a major river in North Germany
Aller (Asturian river), a river in Asturias, Spain
River Aller, a small river on Exmoor in Somerset, England

Inhabited places in the United Kingdom
Aller, Devon, a village in Devon, England
Aller, Dorset, a village in Dorset, England
Aller, Somerset, a village and parish in Somerset, England
Aller and Beer Woods, a Site of Special Scientific Interest in Somerset, England
Aller Hill, a Site of Special Scientific Interest in Somerset, England
Aller Grove, a village in Devon, England
Aller Park, Devon, also known as Aller, near Newton Abbot, Devon, England

Inhabited Places elsewhere
Aller, Asturias, a municipality in Asturias, Spain

Other uses
 Aller (surname)
 Aller Media, a Danish publishing company, publishers of Allers magazine 
 All England Law Reports, law reports covering England and Wales, cited as All ER

See also
Allers (surname)
Obere Aller, a municipality in Saxony-Anhalt, Germany